Vinay Anand (born 23 March 1978)  is an Indian actor, having featured in around 60 Hindi and Bhojpuri movies. Known for his roles in movies like Dil Ne Phir Yaad Kiya, Sautela, Jahan Jaaeyega Hamen Paaeyega and Aamdani Atthani Kharcha Rupaiyaa, he is also a nephew of Bollywood actor Govinda.

Family life

Born on 23 March 1978, Vinay Anand is the son of songwriter Ravi Anand and of Pushpa Ahuja Anand. Pushpa is Bollywood actor Govinda's sister and the daughter of classical singer Nirmala Devi and of Bollywood actor Arun Kumar Ahuja. Vinay Anand is married to Jyoti Anand, sister of popular South Indian actress Simran.

Career

Vinay Anand debuted with Lo Main Aagaya, starring Prem Chopra, Laxmikant Berde and Mohan Joshi. This film was directed by Mahesh Kothare. After the first film, Vinay was offered with several Hindi movies like Dil Ne Phir Yaad Kiya, Sautela, Jahan Jaaeyega Hume Paiyega, Aamdani Atthani Kharcha Rupaiyaa, etc. Vinay has acted in several Bhojpuri films, in the lead role and has a huge fan following.

Music Album

Vinay Anand is now gearing up to make a comeback with a pop album under his newly launched production house, Flying Horses. All the songs have been sung by Vinay himself while Durgesh Vishwakarma is the music composer. Jyoti Anand and Sanjay Kabir have worked as the lyricists on the album. Flying Horses will also produce Hindi films and regional cinema in the coming years.

Filmography

Actor

References

External links
 
 

Male actors in Hindi cinema
Living people
Indian male film actors
1978 births
21st-century Indian male actors
Male actors from Mumbai